Lopez Lake is a reservoir near the city of Arroyo Grande in San Luis Obispo County, California. The dam was built in 1969 and is operated by the San Luis Obispo County Flood Control and Water Conservation District. The earth-fill dam was retrofitted to protect against earthquakes between 2001 and 2003. The winter of 2022-2023 brought the reservoir to near capacity. The last time the spillway overflowed was in 1998.

Lopez Lake provides drinking water for Arroyo Grande, Grover Beach, Pismo Beach, Oceano and Avila Beach. It also provides groundwater recharge, water for irrigation and flood control. Unlike most municipal water supplies, human contact with the water is permitted. Sailing, wind surfing, water skiing, swimming, fishing and camping are popular activities. There is also a waterslide next to the lake. To prevent contamination of the drinking water, water from the lake is piped  to a terminal reservoir, where it remains to allow particles to settle out and pathogens to die off. The water then goes through flocculation, filtration and chlorination at the Lopez Water Treatment Plant.

A network of equestrian, bike and hiking trails criss-cross the park which is primarily oak woodland and coastal sage scrub. The area is frequented by black bears, mountain lions, mule deer and a number of other small mammals.

Several special events are held at the park yearly such as the Lopez Lake Trout Derby held in May, the California Polytechnic University Triathlon and the Scott Tinley Dirty Adventures Triathlon.

See also
List of dams and reservoirs in California
List of lakes in California

References

External links
 

Arroyo Grande, California
Reservoirs in San Luis Obispo County, California
Reservoirs in California
Reservoirs in Southern California